Game of Seduction is a French drama directed by Roger Vadim.

Cast
 Sylvia Kristel as Mathilde Leroy
 Nathalie Delon as Flora de Saint-Gilles
 Jon Finch as Comte Charles de Lapalmmes
 Gisèle Casadesus as Marquise de Lapalmmes
 Marie Lebée as Isabelle de Volnay
 Jean Mermet as The father Anselme
 Anne-Marie Deschodt as Duchesse de Volnay
 Edouard Niermans as Carral
 Annie Braconnier as Victoire
 Katy Amaizo as Pauline
 Serge Marquand as Samson
 Jacques Berthier as Monsieur Leroy

Accolades

References

External links
 

French drama films
1976 drama films
1976 films
Films directed by Roger Vadim
1970s French-language films
1970s French films